The Swabian League of Cities (German: Schwäbischer Städtebund) was a primarily  military alliance between a number of free imperial cities in and around the area now defined as south-western Germany.   Its objective was the maintenance of the privileges, rights, and freedoms of its members, and it therefore also opposed the territorial ambitions of increasingly assertive surrounding states within the Holy Roman Empire such as Bavaria, Württemberg, and Austria.

Beginnings
The Swabian League of Cities was first formed on 20 November 1331, when twenty-two imperial cities of the former Duchy of Swabia banded together in support of the Emperor Louis IV, who in return promised not to mortgage any of them to any imperial vassal. Among the founding cities were Augsburg, Heilbronn, Reutlingen, and Ulm. The counts of Württemberg, Oettingen, and Hohenberg were induced to join in 1340.

Conflict and renewal
Under the rule of the Emperor Charles IV (reigned 1355–1378), the lesser Swabian nobles began to combine against the cities, and formed the Schleglerbund (from Schlegel, a maul). With civil war ensuing in 1367, the emperor, jealous of the growing power of the cities, endeavoured to set up a league under his own control for the maintenance of public peace (Landfriedensbund, 1370).

The mid-fourteenth-century political context
The Emperor, Charles IV was determined that his son Wenceslas should be elected “King of the Romans”.   Top positions in the Holy Roman Empire were elective positions.   The prince-electors were the leading lords of the empire, and back in the fourteenth century there could be nothing automatic about their decisions.   Nevertheless, a tradition had by then been established whereby the “King of the Romans” tended to be elected in succession when a Holy Roman Emperor died, so that the effect of the emperor’s ambition for his son was that Wenceslas (sometimes later distinguished by the sobriquet “Wenceslas the Idle”) should be elected as his own heir apparent.

In order to win the necessary votes, Emperor Charles needed to gain support from the prince-electors and those in a position to influence them; this was traditionally achieved with gifts of money or land.  The towns and cities were likely to end up bearing the burden of making good the resulting shortfall in imperial finances.   Small and middle-sized cities had good reason to fear that they might find themselves pledged by the empire as a security to noble creditors if promised payments failed to be made timely:  in 1376 that is what happened to Donauwörth.    The cities’ independence and their direct relationship with the emperor, which was designed to  liberate them from the cupidity of lords and princes closer to home, was implicitly under threat.   They therefore demanded of the emperor the protection and inviolability enshrined in the “imperial immediacy” relationship.   At the same time, the shared need of the imperial cities to secure their rights and privileges led them to form an alliance.  
 
Collection of the emperor’s dues was a duty that fell on local lords, and in Württemberg that meant the Prince of Württemberg, who was in any case the emperor’s local representative from 1373.   For Eberhard II of Württemberg, the privileged imperial cities were impediments to the extension of the power and influence of Württemberg, and so he had good reason of his own to align his interests with the emperor’s own cupidity, as he enviously watched the high revenues enjoyed by the cities from their trading in cloth and salt.

Fighting and another rebirth for the Swabian League of Cities (1376–1380)
The defeat of the city league by Count Eberhard II of Württemberg in 1372, the murder of the captain of the league, and the breach of his obligations by Charles IV led to the formation of a new league of fourteen Swabian cities on 4 July 1376.   These were led by Ulm.   The others were Biberach an der Riss, Buchhorn, Isny im Allgäu, Konstanz, Leutkirch im Allgäu, Lindau (Bodensee), Memmingen, Ravensburg, Reutlingen, Rottweil, St. Gallen, Überlingen, and Wangen im Allgäu.   The alliance of the fourteen would hold together for four years from 1376.   Additionally, in August 1377 these were joined by Dinkelsbühl, an imperial city on the edge of Franconia, to the north-east of the Swabian region.   Dinkelsbühl was followed by cities from the Franconian heartland such as Rothenburg ob der Tauber and Windsheim.

The emperor refused to recognise the newly revitalised Swabian League, seeing it as a rebellion, and this led to an "imperial war" against the league.  The renewed league triumphed at the Battle of Reutlingen on 14 May 1377 over an army led by Ulrich of Württemberg.   Ulrich was the son of Eberhard II of Württemberg, who was an enthusiastic backer of the emperor's confrontational approach to the Swabian League of Cities.   The emperor himself now became more conciliatory, however, and on 31 May 1377 he lifted the ban he had imposed on the League and set up an arbitration court, which was rapidly extended over the Rhineland, Bavaria, and Franconia.

1381–1386
The power and extent of the Swabian League peaked during the first half of the 1380s, with the number of member cities reaching 32 by 1385.   However, after a couple of decades during which things had begun to stabilize a little after the outbreak of plague that had devastated populations and abruptly distorted economic relationships through most of western Europe during the first half of the 1350s, old tensions were again becoming more apparent.

The South German league of cities
On 20 March 1381, the Rhenish league of cities (der Rheinischer Städtebund), another alliance of cities in the area, came into being.   Its member cities were located west of the core Swabian League members, and included some of the largest and most powerful independent cities on and near to the banks of the Rhine, including Frankfurt, Mainz, Worms, Speyer, and Strasbourg.  This alliance came into being to counter the threat of the “Löwenbund”, an association  of princes and lesser nobility.   In a further development, on 17 June 1381 the Rhenish league of cities
and the Swabian League of Cities came together to create the South German league of cities (der Süddeutscher Städtebund), a military alliance bound by pledges of mutual assistance.   The South German league also had additional members such as Basel and Wil.   The warlords reacted just six days later with the creation of the Rhenish Alliance of Prince-Electors, and set about obtaining royal recognition of it.  In 1381 the League of Cities conducted a war against the Löwenbund in Franconia.  Augsburg, Ulm, and Schwäbisch Hall meanwhile undertook a military push into the nobles' territories.

1387–1388
Württemberg nevertheless struck back and, uniting with the forces of Elector Palatine Rupert I and the Nuremberg Burgrave Frederick V of Hohenzollern, finally defeated the league in 1388 at Döffingen. The next year the city league disbanded according to the resolutions of the Reichstag at Eger.

Members in 1331

  Aalen
  Augsburg
  Biberach
  Bopfingen
  Dinkelsbühl
  Donauwörth
  Esslingen
  Giengen
  Heilbronn
  Isny
  Kaufbeuren
  Kempten
  Leutkirch
  Lindau
  Memmingen
  Nördlingen
  Pfullendorf
  Ravensburg
  Reutlingen
  Schwäbisch Gmünd
  Schwäbisch Hall
  Überlingen
  Ulm
  Wangen
  Weil
  Wimpfen

References

Further reading

 Harro Blezinger: Der Schwäbische Städtebund in den Jahren 1438-1445. Mit einem Überblick über seine Entwicklung seit 1389. Stuttgart 1954 (Zugleich: Freiburg im Breisgau, Univ., Diss., 1953).
 Evamarie Distler: Städtebünde im deutschen Spätmittelalter. Eine rechtshistorische Untersuchung zu Begriff, Verfassung und Funktion (= Studien zur europäischen Rechtsgeschichte. Bd. 207). Klostermann, Frankfurt am Main 2006,  (Zugleich: Frankfurt am Main, Univ., Diss., 2004/2005).
 Friedrich Ebrard: Der erste Annäherungsversuch König Wenzels an den schwäbisch-rheinischen Städtebund 1384-1385. Eine historische Untersuchung. Straßburg 1877.
 Hans-Georg Hofacker: Die schwäbischen Reichslandvogteien im späten Mittelalter (= Spätmittelalter und frühe Neuzeit. Bd. 8). Klett-Cotta, Stuttgart 1980,  (Zugleich: Tübingen, Univ., Diss., 1980).
 Eberhard Holtz: Reichsstädte und Zentralgewalt unter König Wenzel. (1376–1400) (= Studien zu den Luxemburgern und ihrer Zeit. Bd. 4). Fahlbusch, Warendorf 1993,  (Zugleich: Berlin, Akad. d. Wiss., Diss., 1987).
 Ludwig Quidde: Der schwäbisch-rheinische Städtebund im Jahre 1384 bis zum Abschluss der Heidelberger Stallung. Stuttgart 1884.  
 Johannes Schildhauer: Der schwäbische Städtebund – Ausdruck der Kraftentfaltung des deutschen Bürgertums in der zweiten Hälfte des 14. Jahrhunderts. In: Jahrbuch für Geschichte des Feudalismus. Jg. 1, 1977, S. 187–210.
 Alexander Schubert: Der Stadt Nutz oder Notdurft? Die Reichsstadt Nürnberg und der Städtekrieg von 1388/89 (= Historische Studien. Bd. 476). Matthiesen, Husum 2003,  (Zugleich: Bamberg, Univ., Diss., 2001/2002, Rezension bei H-Soz-u-Kult).
 Alexander Schubert: Artikel: Schwäbischer Städtebund, in: Historisches Lexikon Bayerns.
 Georg Tumbült: Kaiser Karl IV. und seine Beziehungen zu den schwäbischen Reichsstädten vom Jahre 1370 bis zur Gründung des Städtebundes im Jahre 1376. Phil. Diss. Münster 1879.
 Wilhelm Vischer: Geschichte des Schwäbischen Städtebundes der Jahre 1376–1389. In: Forschungen zur deutschen Geschichte. Jg. 2, 1862, S. 1–202.
 Wilhelm Vischer: Zur Geschichte des Schwäbischen Städtebundes. In: Forschungen zur deutschen Geschichte. Jg. 3, 1863, S. 1–39.

History of Swabia
14th-century military alliances
1330s establishments in the Holy Roman Empire
1331 establishments in Europe